Cryptocrystalline is a rock texture made up of such minute crystals that its crystalline nature is only vaguely revealed even microscopically in thin section by transmitted polarized light.  Among the sedimentary rocks, chert and flint are cryptocrystalline. Carbonado, a form of diamond, is also cryptocrystalline. Volcanic rocks, especially of the felsic type such as felsites and rhyolites, may have a cryptocrystalline groundmass as distinguished from pure obsidian (felsic) or tachylyte (mafic), which are natural rock glasses. Agate and onyx are examples of cryptocrystalline silica (chalcedony).

See also
 List of rock textures
 Macrocrystalline
 Microcrystalline
 Nanocrystalline
 Rock microstructure

References

Crystals
Lithics
Petrology